William Barksdale (August 21, 1821 – July 3, 1863) was a lawyer, newspaper editor, US Representative, and Confederate general in the American Civil War. A staunch secessionist, he was mortally wounded during the Battle of Gettysburg while he led his brigade's attack on Union forces not far from Cemetery Ridge.

Early life
William Barksdale was born in Smyrna, Tennessee, the son of William Barksdale and Nancy Hervey Lester Barksdale. He was the older brother of Ethelbert Barksdale, who would serve in both the antebellum U.S. Congress and then the Confederate States Congress during the Civil War.  He was of English ancestry which came to America during the 1600s.

Barksdale graduated from the University of Nashville and practiced law in Mississippi from the age of 21, but gave up his practice to become the editor of the Columbus [Mississippi] Democrat, a pro-slavery newspaper. He enlisted in the 2nd Mississippi Infantry Regiment and served in the Mexican War as a captain and quartermaster, but often participated in the infantry fighting as well.

After the war, he entered the U.S. House of Representatives and achieved national prominence as a States' rights Democrat, serving from March 4, 1853, to January 12, 1861. He was considered to be one of the most ferocious of all the "Fire-Eaters" in the House. He allegedly stood by the side of Representative Preston S. Brooks as Brooks attacked Massachusetts abolitionist Senator Charles Sumner in the Senate chamber with a cane, although he was not one of the members that the House tried to censure after the incident.

Before the start of the Civil War, Barksdale inadvertently helped stop one of the most notorious incidents of violence in U.S. legislative history. On February 5, 1858, a brawl between pro and anti-slavery legislators started on the House floor. During the melee, Barksdale swung at Illinois congressman Elihu Washburne, and Washburne's brother Cadwallader, who was a congressman from Wisconsin, grabbed at Barksdale such that it knocked his wig off, and an embarrassed Barksdale put it back on backwards, causing both sides to break out laughing and stopping the fight.

Civil War
After the state of Mississippi seceded just before the start of the Civil War, Barksdale resigned from Congress to become adjutant general, and then quartermaster general, of the Mississippi Militia, at the rank of brigadier general, with date of rank March 1, 1861. On May 1, he was appointed colonel in the Confederate States Army of the 13th Mississippi Infantry, a regiment that he led in the First Battle of Bull Run that summer, and the Battle of Ball's Bluff in October. The following spring, he took his regiment to the Virginia Peninsula and fought in the Peninsula Campaign and the Seven Days Battles. When his brigade commander, Brig. Gen. Richard Griffith, was mortally wounded at the Battle of Savage's Station on June 29, 1862, Barksdale assumed command of the brigade and led it in an heroic, but bloody and futile, charge at the Battle of Malvern Hill. The brigade became known as "Barksdale's Mississippi Brigade." He was promoted to brigadier general on August 12, 1862.

In the Northern Virginia Campaign, Barksdale's Brigade was stationed at Harpers Ferry, and thus did not participate in the Second Battle of Bull Run. In the Maryland Campaign, his brigade was assigned to the division of Maj. Gen. Lafayette McLaws in Lt. Gen. James Longstreet's First Corps of the Army of Northern Virginia. It was one of the brigades that attacked Maryland Heights, leading to the surrender of the Union garrison at Harpers Ferry. At the subsequent Battle of Antietam, McLaws's Division defended the West Woods against the assault by Maj. Gen. John Sedgwick's division, saving the Confederate left flank. At the Battle of Fredericksburg, Barksdale's Brigade defended the waterfront of the city from Union forces attempting to cross the Rappahannock River, sniping at infantry and engineer forces from buildings that had been turned into rubble by Union artillery.

At the Battle of Chancellorsville in May 1863, Barksdale's Brigade was one of the few units in James Longstreet's Corps that was present at the battle; most of the corps was detached for duty in Suffolk, Virginia. Once again, Barksdale's brigade defended the heights above Fredericksburg, this time against his previous adversary, Sedgwick, whose VI Corps was over ten times the size of his brigade. Sedgwick's assault was successful and Barksdale pulled back after delaying the Union force, but he was able to rally his brigade and retake the lost ground the next day.

At the Battle of Gettysburg, Barksdale's Brigade arrived with McLaws's Division after the first day of battle, July 1, 1863. The plan from General Robert E. Lee was for Longstreet's Corps to maneuver into position and attack northeast, up the Emmitsburg Road, to roll up the Union left flank on July 2. Barksdale's sector of the attack placed him directly at the tip of the salient in the Union line anchored at the Peach Orchard, defended by the Union III Corps. At about 5:30 p.m., Barksdale's Brigade burst from the woods and started an irresistible assault, which has been described as one of the most breathtaking spectacles of the Civil War. A Union colonel was quoted as saying, "It was the grandest charge that was ever made by mortal man." Although he ordered his subordinate commanders to walk during the charge, Barksdale himself rode on horseback "in front, leading the way, hat off, his wispy hair shining so that it reminded [a Confederate staff officer] of 'the white plume of Navarre'."

The Confederates smashed the brigade manning the Peach Orchard line, wounding and capturing the Union brigade commander himself. Some of Barksdale's regiments turned to the north and shattered Maj. Gen. Andrew A. Humphreys's division. Others of his regiments went straight ahead. By the time his men had gone as far as Plum Run, a mile into the assault, they were counterattacked by a brigade under Colonel George L. Willard. Barksdale was wounded in his left knee, followed by a cannonball to his left foot, and finally was hit by another bullet to his chest, knocking him off his horse. He told his aide, W.R. Boyd, "I am killed! Tell my wife and children that I died fighting at my post." His troops were forced to leave him for dead on the field and he died the next morning in a Union field hospital (the Joseph Hummelbaugh farmhouse).

Barksdale's remains were interred in the Barksdale family plot of Greenwood Cemetery, Jackson, Mississippi with no marker, but he has cenotaphs in both Greenwood Cemetery and in Friendship Cemetery, Columbus, Mississippi.

In popular media
Barksdale is portrayed in the film Gettysburg and in the prequel, Gods and Generals, by Lester Kinsolving, who is a relative of Barksdale.

Barksdale is also featured in the 2011 History Channel film Gettysburg.

The streets in the Potomac Crossing subdivision in Leesburg, Virginia, are named (in part) after the regimental commanders of the Battle of Ball's Bluff (October 21, 1861). Barksdale Drive was named for Col. Barksdale and is the primary east-west conduit in the development, running just short of a mile to either end of the neighborhood.

See also
 List of American Civil War generals (Confederate)

Notes

References
 Clark, Champ, and the Editors of Time-Life Books. Gettysburg: The Confederate High Tide. Alexandria, VA: Time-Life Books, 1985. .
 Eicher, John H., and David J. Eicher. Civil War High Commands. Stanford, CA: Stanford University Press, 2001. .
 Pfanz, Harry W. Gettysburg – The Second Day. Chapel Hill: University of North Carolina Press, 1987. .
 Tagg, Larry. The Generals of Gettysburg. Campbell, CA: Savas Publishing, 1998. .
 Tucker, Phillip T. Barksdale's Charge: The True High Tide of the Confederacy at Gettysburg, July 2, 1863. Casemate Publishers, 2013. .
 Warner, Ezra J. Generals in Gray: Lives of the Confederate Commanders. Baton Rouge: Louisiana State University Press, 1959. .
 U.S. Congress Biographical Directory

Further reading
 Guelzo, Allen C. Gettysburg: The Last Invasion. New York: Knopf, 2013. .
 His Gallant Spirit Went Home: The Burial of General William Barksdale in Jackson Mississippians in the Confederate Army, 2013.

1821 births
1863 deaths
People from Smyrna, Tennessee
American people of English descent
Democratic Party members of the United States House of Representatives from Mississippi
American Fire-Eaters
Politicians from Jackson, Mississippi
American military personnel of the Mexican–American War
American militia generals
Confederate States Army brigadier generals
People of Mississippi in the American Civil War
Confederate States of America military personnel killed in the American Civil War
United States politicians killed during the Civil War